Psychotraumatology is the study of psychological trauma. Specifically, this discipline is involved with treating, preventing, and researching traumatic situations and people's reactions to them. It particularly focuses on the treatment of post-traumatic stress disorder (PTSD) and acute stress disorder (ASD), but can be used to treat any adverse reactions a person may have after experiencing a traumatic event.

History 
The emergence of psychotraumatology as a field begins with the legitimization of PTSD as a psychological disorder. Symptoms of PTSD have been continuously reported in the context of war since the 6th century B.C., but it was not officially recognized as a valid disorder until it finally classified by the American Psychiatric Association (APA) in 1980. Once it was officially recognized as an issue, clinical research on PTSD increased dramatically, giving way to the field of  psychotraumatology. The term "psychotraumatology" was coined by George S. Everly, Jr. and Jeffrey M. Lating in the text entitled "Psychotraumatology" (1995).

Donovan ( 1991) suggested that the term traumatology be used to unite the various endeavors within the field of traumatic stress studies.  As Donovan notes, however, the term traumatology also denotes the branch of medicine that deals with wounds and serious injuries. Schnitt (1993) expressed concern over Donovan's choice of a term that has at least two meanings. He urged clarity of communications as this new field expands; indeed, expansion is often built upon and facilitated by clarity of communications fostered by sematic precision. In a rebuttal of sorts, Donovan (1993) argued for a term broader in scope than traumatic stress studies, the phrase that has been used historically to unite the field. Clearly Schnitt's (1993) commentary offers insight to be considered. There is significant potential for ambiguity in the use of traumatology as a unifying term for the field of psychological trauma. Donovan (1993) argues that the term is "socially influential as well as conceptually and pragmatically useful" (p. 41 0). The potential ambiguity serves to diminish the promised pragmatics, but the lack of sematic precision is easily corrected. 

In 1995, the addition of the prefix psycho- to the root traumatology appears to clarify potential ambiguities and more clearly defines the conduct at hand. Such reasoning serves as the foundation for the choice of psychotraumatology as the title of this field published in the Volume of Psychotraumatology.  

There are three main categories that are looked at in psychotrauamatology: the factors before, during, and after a psychologically traumatizing event has occurred. Such factors include:
 Factors examined before traumatizing event
 Personal developmental history
 Familial history (inclusive of both birth parents and primary guardians)
 Predisposing personality factors
 Occupational, behavioral and psychiatric risk factors
 Predisposing psychological states
 Factors examined about traumatizing event
 Environmental, interpersonal, situational, and biological factors
 Factors examined after traumatizing event
 Psychological responses to trauma
 Central nervous system, systemic pathophysiological, behavioral and psychophysiological effects from previous conditions

Psychotherapist Specialization 
The term psychotraumatology is used in the present context to define or order the conduct of inquiry and the categorization of information relevant to psychological trauma. Psychotraumatology may be defined as the study of psychological trauma; more specifically, the study of the processes and factors that lie (a) antecedent to, (b) concomitant with, and (c) subsequent to psychological traumatization (Everly, 1992; 1993). 

Since the adoption of new evidence based models in trauma treatment a new specialization in psychotherapy has emerged, the Psychotraumatologist.

According to the International Psychotraumatology Association a Psychotraumatologist standard of education and ethics:

A Licensed Clinical Psychotherapist or Psychiatrist with knowledge and training: 

 Neurobiology & Neuroscience of Complex Trauma and Dissociation 
 Expanded knowledge of the science & applicability of Porges’ Polyvagal Theory 
 Neuroplasticity & Neural Networks 
 Psychopharmacology – trauma specific 
 Traumatic or Disorganized Attachment 
 Styles/strategies/stages of attachment 
 Symptoms of traumatic attachment 
 Lack of attachment 
 Neglect 
 Dissociation, (“fragmentation”) and working with parts of self  
 Adaptations to complex trauma and/or managing co-morbidities inclusive of extreme symptoms: selfinjury, suicide, dissociation, numbing, process and substance addictions, eating disordered behavior, chronic, intractable depression, hyper/hypo sexuality, rage
 Reframing the symptoms (survival resources or appreciating the protective function of trauma symptoms) 
 Therapist reactions and managing the therapeutic process: 
 Countertransference redefined (exploring the parts of the therapist that can get activated while working with complex trauma clients) 
 Therapeutic boundaries 
 Self-care for the therapist 
 Phase-Oriented Treatment 
 Phase I: Safety & Stabilization (development of therapeutic alliance), skills building (DBT Skills: mindfulness, emotion regulation, distress tolerance and interpersonal effectiveness that bring client back into the window of tolerance) 
 Sensorimotor Psychotherapy
 IFS 
 YST
 Neurosequential Therapy
 Polivagal Therapy
 Phase II: Trauma Processing Modalities.   Compare and contrast the following treatment approaches, including both pros and cons and risks and limitations with an emphasis on any restrictions or cautions when working with complex and dissociative clients. Only are recognized as efficient and valid these Evidence Based Trauma Treatment Models:
 EMDR 
 Internal Family Systems 
 Brainspotting 
 MDMA-assisted therapy for Complex PTSD *(The FDA gave the Breakthrough therapy designation and it legal use is only available in the USA) 
 Phase III: Reintegration into larger systems/mourning/meaning-making/Self.
 Internal Family Systems
 EMDR
 The Self Care Scale

Sub-specializations 
There are three main sub-specialization in the Psychotraumatology Field 
 Dissociation
 Childhood Trauma or Developmental Trauma
 Complex PTSD or PTSD-C

Notable Psychotraumatologists 

 Onno van der Hart, Ph.D. 
 Charles R. Figley
 Janina Fisher, Ph.D.
 Jennifer Freyd, Ph.D.
 Jim Hopper, Ph.D.
 Bessel Vanderkolk MD

Major journals in the field 
 European Journal of Psychotraumatology
 Crisis Stress and Human Resilience
 Traumatology
 Psychological Trauma
 Journal of Traumatic Stress
Journal of Trauma and Dissociation

Major Associations 

 European Society for Traumatic Stress Studies
 IPTA - International Psychotraumatology Association.
International Society for the Study of Traumatic Stress and Dissociation
Trauma Research Foundation (formerly Trauma Research Center)
Newman - Psychotraumatology Education for Spanish Speakers Therapists

References

Clinical psychology
Traumatology